The International Freedom Battalion, commonly abbreviated as IFB or EÖT, is a revolutionary socialist armed group consisting of leftist foreign fighters fighting for the People's Defense Units in the Syrian Civil War in support of the Rojava Revolution and against the Turkish Armed Forces, the Syrian National Army, and Islamic State. The formation of the IFB was announced in June 2015 in Ras al-Ayn. Inspiration for the group came from the International Brigades of the Spanish Civil War. The political ideologies of the fighters include anarchism, Marxism–Leninism, Hoxhaism, Maoism, and anarcho-communism.

Main groups
The International Freedom Battalion was formed by left-wing armed groups (as well as individuals not part of any other groups), most of whom had been fighting with the YPG before the creation of the IFB. These groups include:

Birleşik Özgürlük Güçleri

The United Freedom Forces (or BÖG), inspired by the International Brigades of the Spanish Civil War, were founded in December 2014 in the town of Kobanî as an organization of foreign leftist fighters of both revolutionary socialist and anarchist convictions. While the MLKP didn't join, these groups would eventually unite in the International Freedom Battalion. BÖG also has a female branch named "Women's Freedom Forces" (Kadın Özgürlük Gücü in Turkish). BÖG is considered to be the largest group within the International Freedom Battalion. BOG contains several factions, see Member groups

Marksist-Leninist Komünist Partisi

The Marxist–Leninist Communist Party (abbreviated as MLKP) is an underground Hoxhaist communist party from Turkey. MLKP fighters had reportedly been sent to Syria to fight with the People's Defense Units since 2012. MLKP fighters also joined the Kurdistan Workers' Party's (PKK) December 2014 Sinjar offensive in Northern Iraq in defence of the Yezidi minority in Sinjar. In March 2015 a 19-year-old German woman, Ivana Hoffmann, was killed whilst fighting the Islamic State (IS) during the Eastern al-Hasakah offensive, making her the third foreign fighter, as well as the first female foreign fighter, to die while fighting alongside the YPG. MLKP's female organisation, Komünist Kadın Örgütü, has also been involved in fighting. MLKP was heavily involved in forming the International Freedom Battalion.

TKP/ML TİKKO

The Liberation Army of the Workers and Peasants of Turkey (abbreviated as TİKKO) is the armed wing of the Communist Party of Turkey/Marxist–Leninist (abbreviated as TKP/ML), a Maoist insurgent organisation in Turkey. On 25 March 2016, the TKP/ML TİKKO headquarters in Serêkaniyê were targeted by a motorcycle bomb, causing slight injuries to two members and damage to the headquarters. Two suspects were detained by the Asayiş.

Türkiye Komünist Emek Partisi/Leninist

The Communist Labour Party of Turkey/Leninist (abbreviated as TKEP/L) is an illegal Marxist-Leninist party in Turkey.

Sosyal İsyan
Social Insurrection was founded in 2013 in Turkey by a group of green anarchists in Tuzluçayır.

Reconstrucción Comunista

Communist Reconstruction (abbreviated as RC) is a Marxist-Leninist group from Spain. The group carries a variant of the Flag of the Second Spanish Republic. RC has strong ties to the MLKP and members fight as part of MLKP formations, even fighting in Sinjar. Two members of the group were arrested by police after their return to Spain and were accused of participating in an armed conflict outside of Spain without authorization from the state, as well as putting national interests at risk and joining groups fighting against ISIL that are considered terrorist organizations by international organizations. In January 2016, eight Spanish citizens and one Turkish citizen were arrested in Spain. The Spanish Interior Ministry said in a statement that "The detained, in collaboration with other individuals residing in various European countries, were providing the necessary infrastructure for displaced people to travel abroad and to finally integrate in the ranks of the Peoples' Protection Units (YPG) or one of the armed wings of the organization" and that the majority of the arrested belong to the group 'Communist Reconstruction'.

Revolutionary Union for Internationalist Solidarity

The Revolutionary Union for Internationalist Solidarity (abbreviated as ΕΣΔΑ) is an armed fighter group from Greece. They have fought in Syria since 2015.
Their appearance has alarmed Greek security and intelligence officials alleging that "warriors will be trained in guerilla warfare and then will be able to apply what they have learned in their homeland".

Bob Crow Brigade

The Bob Crow Brigade (abbreviated as BCB) is a group of fighters from the United Kingdom and Ireland named after Bob Crow, an English trade union leader and self-described "communist/socialist", who had died of a heart attack in March 2014. The group expressed solidarity with striking rail workers in the United Kingdom. Steve Hedley, senior assistant general secretary of the RMT, said: "Bob would have been honoured that young people from Britain would fight the forces of evil in his name. A great admirer of the international brigades that fought in Spain, Crow would of course have drawn the parallels with the new international brigades fighting clerical fascism and defending Yazhidi, Muslim and Christian workers from slavery and persecution."

After Turkey and its allied rebel groups invaded parts of northern Syria and clashed with the Syrian Democratic Forces, Turkish officials stated that they will treat British and other foreign volunteers fighting alongside the YPG as terrorists. On 2 September, the Bob Crow Brigade relocated from the Raqqa front to Manbij and stated "When we came to defend the revolution we meant from all enemies, big or small". On 7 September 2016, the Bob Crow Brigade sent a message of solidarity to the women of Ireland fighting to repeal the Eighth Amendment of the Constitution of Ireland on the 33rd anniversary of its approval by referendum, as well as striking Irish bus workers the following day.

Henri Krasucki Brigade

The Henri Krasucki Brigade is a group of fighters from France. Inspired by their English-speaking counterparts of the Bob Crow Brigade, they named themselves after the French trade-unionist Henri Krasucki. The group expressed solidarity with the CGT union and the Air France workers on trial for the "shirt-ripping case" over an incident on 5 October 2015, which arose from a dispute over the aviation giant's plans to cut 2,900 jobs.

International Revolutionary People's Guerrilla Forces

The International Revolutionary People's Guerrilla Forces (abbreviated as IRPGF) was a militant, armed, self-organized, and horizontal collective of foreign anarchist fighters from around the world. The formation of the IRPGF was announced on 31 March 2017 in a video and text release to several revolutionary websites and media organizations. According to the declaration of the group, their goals are to defend the social revolution in Rojava and spread anarchism.

They are a member organization and part of the management team of the International Freedom Battalion since April 2017, this was announced by the IFB on 17 May on their Facebook page. Their public formation and solidarity campaigns have garnered interest and support from around the world as well as backlash. On 24 July, the group established an LGBT unit, the TQILA. On September 24, 2018, the group announced its dissolution in a final communique.

The Queer Insurrection and Liberation Army

The Queer Insurrection and Liberation Army (abbreviated as TQILA) was a unit of the IFB announced on 24 July 2017, by members of the IRPGF from Raqqa City and disbanded on 24 September 2018.
The group launched a statement explaining the purposes of its formation in which the response to persecution of LGBT persons by ISIL is highlighted as one of the main motivations of the group.

They were part of the International Revolutionary People's Guerrilla Forces and International Freedom Battalion.

Michael Israel Brigade 

The Michael Israel Brigade formed in early 2018 at the time of the Battle of Afrin as an international volunteer unit. It adopted its name in homage to an American fighter of the International Freedom Battalion, Michael Israel, also known as Robin Agiri, killed by a Turkish bombardment northeast of al-Bab on November 29, 2016, during Operation Euphrates Shield. In its first press release, published on February 13, 2018, the brigade presented itself as a "group of communists, socialists, anarchists and anti-fascists, from all four corners of the world, [...] united in Rojava by the principles of solidarity, internationalism and anti-fascism". The group is made up of far-left foreign volunteers, mainly Turks and Westerners.

The brigade announced that it was going to the front in Afrin on February 19, 2018. However, the Syrian Democratic Forces were severely affected by the artillery and air strikes of the Turkish Army. The Michael Israel Brigade announced its withdrawal from Afrin on March 22, 2018, it recognized the death of at least one of its fighters - a Turkish volunteer named Şevger Ara Makhno, killed on March 8 by an airstrike in the village of Berbêné - as well as several wounded. Some fighters were then sent to eastern Syria to take part in the offensive.

Structure

 United Freedom Forces
 Women's Freedom Forces
 Revolutionary Communard Party
 MLSPB-DC
 Betül Altindal Taburu
 Serpil Polat Taburu
 Social Insurrection
 Devrimci Cephe
 Devrimci Karargâh
 Revolution Party of Turkey
 Emek ve Özgürlük Cephesi
 Halkın Devrimci Güçleri
 PDKÖ
 Aziz GÜLER Özgürlük Gücü Milis Örgütü
 Kader Ortakaya Timi
 Kızılbaş Timi
 Mahir Arpaçay Devrimci Savaş Okulu
 Necdet Adalı Müfrezesi
 Spartaküs Timi
 Şehit Bedreddin Taburu
 MLKP
 MLKP/KKÖ
 TKP/ML TİKKO
 MKP
 Reconstrucción Comunista
 TKEP/L
 RUIS
 Bob Crow Brigade
 Henri Krasucki Brigade
 IRPGF
 TQILA
 Tekoşîna Anarşîst (Anarchist Struggle)

Gallery

Notable fatalities

See also

Belligerents in the Syrian civil war
International Legion of Territorial Defense of Ukraine
Peoples' United Revolutionary Movement

References

Bibliography

External links

 

 
Anarchism in Syria
Socialism in Syria
People's Protection Units
Military units and formations established in 2015